Kleiner Koserbach is a small river of Bavaria, Germany. It flows into the Koserbach near Wirsberg.

See also
List of rivers of Bavaria

Rivers of Bavaria
Rivers of Germany